The mir-172 microRNA is thought to target mRNAs coding for APETALA2-like transcription factors.  It has been verified experimentally in the model plant, Arabidopsis thaliana (mouse-ear cress).  The mature sequence is excised from the 3' arm of the hairpin.

References

Further reading

External links
 
 MI0000215
 MI0001139

MicroRNA
MicroRNA precursor families